Kuznetsovsky Tunnel is a railroad tunnel on the Baikal Amur Mainline (BAM), on the Sikhote-Alin mountain range in Khabarovsk Krai, Russia. The tunnel, as well as the Kuznetsovsky Pass it provides access to, and a nearby railway station, are all named after Arseny Kuznetsov, a construction engineer who found the suitable location for the railroad, but died during the construction of the tunnel.

That old tunnel was built during World War II and completed by 1945. Currently another tunnel is constructed nearby; with a length of  this new Kuznetsovsky Tunnel will be one of the longest in Russia.

The construction of the new tunnel will lead to a significant increase in freight traffic on the Eastern Baikal Amur Mainline, which connects Komsomolsk-on-Amur with the sea ports of Vanino and Sovetskaya Gavan. There is expected a growth from 12 million tons in 2009 to 24 million by 2015. The total cost of the project is estimated to be 59.8 billion rubles. The new tunnel was inaugurated in December 2012.

See also

Severomuysky Tunnel

References

Railway tunnels in Russia
Buildings and structures in Khabarovsk Krai
Tunnels completed in 1945
Rail transport in Khabarovsk Krai